Corinne Gendron (1968) is a Québécoise scholar, researcher, lawyer and sociologist, specializing in new forms of economic regulation and sustainable development. Gendron holds the Chair of Social Responsibility and Sustainable Development from the Université du Québec à Montréal, where she is a professor in the Department of Strategy, Social and Environmental Responsibility of the School of Management Sciences. She is a member of the Académie des technologies and a Chevalier of the French Legion of Honour.

Biography

In the 1990s, Gendron spent a summer at an environmentally-focused holiday camp, which was her starting point for an interest in sustainable development. Gendron entered the Université de Montréal in 1986 and earned a bachelor's degree in law in 1989. She passed the bar in 1990, completed an MBA in 1993, and a Ph.D. in sociology in 2000 at the Université du Québec à Montréal.

Through numerous scientific publications, she has contributed research on the process of institutionalizing the movements of fair trade, socially responsible investment and engaged consumerism in various sectors. Since May 2011, she has been a member of the Government of Quebec's Shale Gas Strategic Environmental Assessment Committee.

On 10 December 2014 Gendron was elected a member of the French Académie des technologies. By decree of the President of the Republic dated 31 December 2015, Corinne Gendron was elevated to the rank of Chevalier (knight) of the National Order of the Legion of Honour by the Ministry of National Education, Higher Education and Research for France.

Bibliography

References

Additional sources

1968 births
Living people
French Quebecers
Université de Montréal alumni
Université du Québec à Montréal alumni
Academic staff of the Université du Québec à Montréal
Writers from Montreal
Recipients of the Legion of Honour
Canadian sociologists
Canadian non-fiction writers in French
Canadian women non-fiction writers
Canadian women sociologists